
Opera America, styled OPERA America, is a New York-based service organization promoting the creation, presentation, and enjoyment of opera in the United States. Almost all professional opera companies and some semi-professional companies in the United States are members of the organization including such opera companies as the Metropolitan Opera, San Francisco Opera, Lyric Opera of Chicago, and Dallas Opera. Opera America also includes opera companies from Canada. 

The organization was founded in 1970 and has been led by President and CEO Marc A. Scorca since 1990.

In April 2014, advisers from Opera America worked with San Diego Opera to develop a plan to prevent that company's closure.

National Opera Center
The National Opera Centre at 330 Seventh Avenue, Chelsea, Manhattan, has two performance venues: the Marc A. Scorca Hall and the Plácido Domingo Hall. It also provides private studios and a rehearsal hall. The National Opera Center has been the venue of performances by artists of companies such as Wolf Trap Opera. In 2018, the Christman Opera Company performed Theodore Christman's operas Adriana McMannes and A Metamorphosis in Plácido Domingo Hall. The Opera Center has been the venue of premieres and workshops of works by composers such as Clint Borzoni and Bruce Wolosoff.

See also
 Deutscher Bühnenverein, equivalent national organization in Germany
 Réunion des Opéras de France, French national association
 Opera Europa, sister organization covering Europe

References

External links 

Opera organizations
Music organizations based in the United States
1970 establishments in the United States
Arts organizations established in 1970